This is a list of members of the Swiss National Council for the 2019–2023 term.  The National Council has 200 members, each elected to represent one of twenty-six cantons.  Elections were held on 20 October 2019, along with elections to the Council of States.  Eleven parties are represented in the National Council, the largest of which is the Swiss People's Party.  The Swiss Party of Labour/Solidarity coalition and the Geneva Citizens' Movement have the smallest representation with one member each.

Members

References

See also
 List of members of the Swiss Council of States

2019
Switzerland